This is a list of the Australia national soccer team results from 1950 to 1979.

1950s

1950

1954

1955

1956

1958

1960s

1965

1967

1968

1969

1970s

1970

1971

1972

1973

1974

1975

1976

1977

1978

1979

References

External links
 Australian Results

Australia national soccer team results
1950 in Australian sport
1954 in Australian sport
1956 in Australian sport
1958 in Australian sport
1965 in Australian soccer
1967 in Australian soccer
1968 in Australian soccer
1969 in Australian sport
1970 in Australian sport
1971 in Australian sport
1972 in Australian sport
1973 in Australian sport
1974 in Australian soccer
1975 in Australian sport
1976 in Australian sport
1977 in Australian soccer
1978 in Australian soccer
1979 in Australian soccer